Malaysian United Indigenous Party of Sabah (Malay: Parti Pribumi Bersatu Malaysia Sabah), also abbreviated as Sabah BERSATU or sometimes written as Sabah PPBM, is a branch of a political party in Sabah, Malaysia. Before the mass resignations of the members of the Gabungan Rakyat Sabah (GRS) and the entire leadership of Sabah BERSATU from the party in December 2022, Sabah BERSATU was split from the central Malaysian United Indigenous Party (BERSATU) in their political affiliations at the federal level. It was the only branch of BERSATU that moved without direction from the central leader. This party was led and directed by Hajiji Noor and was built independently in political affiliations after the approval of the GRS registration. The branch of the party, together with other component parties of the GRS coalition, partnered with Barisan Nasional (BN) in the 2022 general election, contrary to the rest of BERSATU, which contested under the Perikatan Nasional (PN), opposing BN. Unlike the central BERSATU, specifically branches of the BERSATU party across Peninsular Malaysia and Sarawak which do not support the federal government and is part of the federal opposition, Sabah BERSATU supported and was part of the federal government under Prime Minister Anwar Ibrahim. Sabah BERSATU also had two elected representatives holding a ministerial and a deputy ministerial positions respectively in the Anwar Ibrahim cabinet.

History

Political status of the branch
Based on the statement of BERSATU Vice President Ronald Kiandee, the position of Sabah BERSATU is not similar to that of BERSATU. This happened after the formation of the Sabah coalition state government through a combination of several local parties and BN which was later known as GRS+BN. BERSATU is the founder of PN at the national level, but there are parties in GRS that are not component parties of Perikatan Nasional. In Sabah itself, BN is not a component coalition of GRS such as the United Sabah Party (PBS), Homeland Solidarity Party (STAR) and BERSATU. However, BN is only an associate of GRS as BN did not allow it to join another political coalition as a component coalition.

Mass resignations of GRS members and Sabah BERSATU leadership from the party
On 10 December 2022, GRS Chairman and Sabah BERSATU Chairman Hajiji led and announced the mass resignations of GRS members and the entire leadership of Sabah BERSATU from the party. He also announced that they would form a new local party together in future. Following this, GRS has officially severed ties with BERSATU and PN. At the moment, they remained in GRS as direct members. Hajiji gave explanations on the opposing political affiliations of BERSATU at the national and state levels following the 2022 general election that have made the status quo no longer tenable mainly due to that Sabah BERSATU led by him was the federal government but national BERSATU led by Muhyiddin Yassin was the federal opposition. After the announcement, media reports suggested that Sabah BERSATU had collapsed or been dissolved. However, BERSATU Deputy President Ahmad Faizal Azumu denied the suggestion, stating that there were many Sabah BERSATU members who did not follow the footsteps and path of the GRS members. He also stressed that Sabah BERSATU would remain to exist and its leadership would be restructured by remaining members. One of those is BERSATU Vice President, Beluran BERSATU Division Chief and Beluran MP Ronald Kiandee who was dropped by GRS to contest in the 2022 general election and won by contesting using the PN ticket, which that was a component coalition of GRS. Despite being in Sabah BERSATU who was in GRS, he was not considered as a GRS member due to his difference in personal political affiliation with GRS and the PN but not GRS ticket he used to contest in the election. He proved the scenario by clarifying that he would remain in Sabah BERSATU and had not left the party together with GRS. He also reiterated the statement of Ahmad Faizal. Ronald became the sole Sabah BERSATU MP and the sole Sabah MP who does not support the federal government. The act has left significant changes in the politics of the nation and Sabah. For instances, GRS had been turned into a Sabah local political coalition like the Gabungan Parti Sarawak (GPS) of Sarawak as BERSATU who was previously its component party is a national party, Sabah PN was left with only a component party, the Sabah Progressive Party (SAPP) led by Yong Teck Lee. However, Yong would also support the federal government as well as the Sabah BERSATU had also dissolved its leadership, lost majority of its members that are in GRS, control of the Sabah coalition state government and a minister, six of its MPs, all of its Senators as well as its MLAs. This has indicated that Sabah BERSATU was only seriously weakened instead of being dissolved or having collapsed. Sabah BERSATU also had a political affiliation and became the federal opposition after the resignations of GRS members who were in the federal government. It is also believed that it would reuse the name of PN instead of GRS to refer to Sabah BERSATU given that they shared similar political affiliations after the act. The act has raised questions on whether it is considered as an act of party-hopping as this would affect the qualifications of the six GRS MPs as they were involved in leaving the party which has possibly breached the anti-party hopping law that was in effect after being passed by the Parliament and applying to the MPs. MPs found to have done so must resign and vacate their seats for by-elections to be held to elect new MPs and fill the seats.

List of leaders

List of Chairmen

Elected representatives

Dewan Rakyat (House of Representatives)

Members of Parliament of the 15th Malaysian Parliament 

Sabah BERSATU has 1 member in the House of Representatives.

General election results

State election results

See also 
 List of political parties in Malaysia
 Malaysian General Election
 Politics of Malaysia
 Barisan Nasional
 Pakatan Harapan
 Perikatan Nasional
 Gabungan Rakyat Sabah
 2020–2022 Malaysian political crisis

References

 
 

 
Political parties established in 2016
Political parties in Malaysia
2016 establishments in Malaysia
Islamic political parties in Malaysia
Malaysian nationalism
Social conservative parties